Gwent Broadcasting (also known on air as GB Radio) was an Independent Local Radio station that broadcast to the Newport, South Wales between June 1983 and February 1985. The station closed down due to financial difficulties. After a short period as a relay of nearby CBC, the two stations formally merged to become Red Dragon Radio.

The station's launch was a landmark in the history of VHF/FM broadcasting in the UK as it was the first to transmit in the then newly released 102.2 to 104.5Mhz part of the VHF/FM waveband.

See also

Red Dragon Radio

References

Further reading
 UK Radio - A Brief History - Part 3 - Commercial Expansion By Mike Smith, MDS975

Culture in Newport, Wales